Globally, India ranks 3rd in the world in terms of the number of freelancers, with approximately 26 million independent workers in various sectors such as IT and programming, finance, sales and marketing, designing, animation, videography, content and academic writing.

Government  
There has not been much effort from India's government towards assisting freelancers until recently when it set up the Digital India Platform (DIP), an initiative to digitalize all government documents and where freelancers would be hired to help carry out the task. Anyone with a knowledge of computers has access to the Internet and owns a valid Aadhar card would be eligible to apply for this freelance opportunity.

Economic contributions 
India has about 26 million freelancers and they have been significantly boosting the growth of start-ups. While fostering the start-up economy in the country, Indian freelancers are also increasingly providing expertise to top-drawer corporations as business environments and needs evolve. According to data from the Freelancing in America: 2021 survey, freelancers in India earned a total of approximately $109 billion in 2020. The growth of freelancing in India can be attributed in part to lower costs for services. For example, an experienced freelance logo designer in the United States charges around $1,000 USD, while an experienced freelance logo designer in India will charge $120 USD.

Female Indian freelance workers 
There are numerous highly educated women armed with masters and doctorate degrees in India who cannot pursue a regular occupation due to family and social obligations.  Rather than cutting short their professional careers, these women seek out freelancing options.

Despite freelancing providing a viable career option for women looking for flexibility and control the number of Indian women taking up freelancing is still small as compared to their male counterparts. According to data from the Freelancing in America: 2021 survey, approximately 45% of freelancers in India are women. Not only this but the same report reveals that women are paid lesser than the men who freelance. According to the survey, the median annual income for male freelancers in India is approximately $6,600, while the median annual income for female freelancers is approximately $6,500.

Companies and freelancers 
The distinct shifts in technology, culture, demographics, and professional needs and goals have driven companies to reassess their human resource policies to accommodate the burgeoning freelance economy. Start-ups in India are hiring 50 percent of the total freelancing workforce. These companies are not only hiring freelancers or independent consultants at lower management. In fact, freelance CFOs are also getting on board in order to help streamline a company's finances. According to industry estimates, hiring the services of an outsourced CFO can result in operational savings of 30 to 70 percent. Depending upon the nature of the job, fees can range from Rs. 30,000 to a few lakhs per month.

References

Further reading 
 Das, Goutam. "Gig work: India now contributes 1 in 4 freelancers" (January 9, 2018). Business Today. Retrieved November 14, 2018.

Employment in India
Outsourcing in India